Carlos Martín Luque (born 1 March 1993) is an Argentine footballer who plays for C.D.S. Vida in Honduras, as a left winger.

Club career
Born in Las Varillas, Córdoba, Luque joined Colón's youth setup in 2001, aged eight. He made his first team – and Primera División – debut on 13 March 2011, coming on as a second-half substitute in a 0–4 home loss against Racing Club.

Luque scored his first professional goal on 30 November 2011, netting the first in a 2–1 Copa Argentina home win against Talleres de Córdoba. He became a regular starter for the club only during the 2013–14 campaign, contributing with two goals in 27 appearances.

In May 2014 Luque joined Brazilian Série A club Internacional, for a fee of US$ 2.45 million. He made his debut for the club on 20 July, replacing Charles Aránguiz in a 4–0 home routing of Flamengo.

After being rarely used by Inter, Luque subsequently served loan stints at Peñarol and Alcorcón.

In January 2020 Luque moved to Honduras and joined C.D.S. Vida.

International career
Luque was called up for the Argentina under-20s by coach Walter Perazzo and was part of the squad in the 2011 FIFA U-20 World Cup. He also appeared in that year's Pan American Games.

Honours
Internacional
Campeonato Gaúcho: 2015

Peñarol
Primera División: 2015–16

References

External links

1993 births
Living people
Sportspeople from Córdoba Province, Argentina
Argentine footballers
Association football forwards
Club Atlético Colón footballers
San Martín de San Juan footballers
Sport Club Internacional players
Peñarol players
AD Alcorcón footballers
C.D.S. Vida players
Argentine Primera División players
Campeonato Brasileiro Série A players
Uruguayan Primera División players
Segunda División players
Argentina under-20 international footballers
Footballers at the 2011 Pan American Games
Argentine expatriate footballers
Argentine expatriate sportspeople in Uruguay
Argentine expatriate sportspeople in Brazil
Argentine expatriate sportspeople in Spain
Argentine expatriate sportspeople in Honduras
Expatriate footballers in Brazil
Expatriate footballers in Uruguay
Expatriate footballers in Spain
Expatriate footballers in Honduras
Pan American Games medalists in football
Pan American Games silver medalists for Argentina
Medalists at the 2011 Pan American Games